Parliamentary Secretary to the Ministry of Labour was a junior position within the British government, subordinate to the Minister of Labour. It was established in December 1916, at the same time as the Ministry of Labour. When the Ministry of Labour was renamed the Ministry of Labour and National Service in 1939, the position was consequently renamed Parliamentary Secretary to the Ministry of Labour and National Service. When the Ministry resumed its former name in 1959, the office once again became named Parliamentary Secretary to the Ministry of Labour. The post was abolished in 1964.

List of Parliamentary Secretaries

Parliamentary Secretaries to the Ministry of Labour, 1916-1939

Parliamentary Secretaries to the Ministry of Labour and National Service, 1939-1959

Parliamentary Secretaries to the Ministry of Labour, 1959-1964

Lists of government ministers of the United Kingdom
Defunct ministerial offices in the United Kingdom